Edison Qafa (born 16 November 1989 in Përmet) is an Albanian footballer who most recently played as a striker for FK Kukësi in the Albanian Superliga.

References

External links
 Profile - FSHF

1989 births
Living people
People from Përmet
Association football forwards
Albanian footballers
A.E. Ermionida F.C. players
FC Kamza players
KF Apolonia Fier players
FK Kukësi players
Kategoria Superiore players
Kategoria e Parë players
Albanian expatriate footballers
Expatriate footballers in Greece
Albanian expatriate sportspeople in Greece